Pup'ung station is a railway station of the Korean State Railway in Pup'ung, Sakchu County, North P'yŏngan Province, North Korea, on P'yŏngbuk Line of the Korean State Railway. It is also the starting point of the Sup'ung Line and the Amrokkang Line.

History
Pup'ung station, along with the rest of the main line, was opened by the P'yŏngbuk Railway on 27 September 1939.

Services
Pup'ung station is served by  six pairs of commuter trains along the Ch'ongsu–Sup'ung–P'ungnyŏn route.

References

Railway stations in North Korea